Swords was an American indie rock band that formed in 1999 in Portland, Oregon. The band took their name from the idea of being "hired assassins of rock". The name of the band was shortened to Swords from The Swords Project in 2003. In May 2006, the band announced they would be breaking up, but would most likely continue working together in various other music projects. They never did.

Discography

As Swords 
Metropolis (2005)

As The Swords Project 
The Swords Project EP (2001)
Entertainment Is Over If You Want It (2003)

Members 
Joey Ficken (drums)/(Gum Chewer)
Corey Ficken (Bass guitar/vocals)
Liza Rietz (Violin/accordion/melodica/keyboards)
Ryan Stowe (Baritone guitar)
Evan Railton (Electronics/drums/keyboards)
Jeff Gardner (Guitar)
Amy Annelle (Guitar)
Sierra Collum (Violin & Viola)
Brooke Crouser (keyboards & Melodica)

Contemporaries 
Tarentel
The Six Parts Seven
Priestess

External links 
Swords at Arena Rock Recording Co.
[ Swords on Allmusic]
Swords on MySpace

Musical groups from Portland, Oregon
Indie rock musical groups from Oregon
Arena Rock Recording Company artists
1999 establishments in Oregon
2006 disestablishments in Oregon
Musical groups established in 1999
Musical groups disestablished in 2006